Elena Prosteva (November 22, 1990) is a female skier from Russia. She represented Russia in the 2010 Winter Olympics, in the Alpine skiing events.

Results
2010 Winter Olympics:Downhill–26Combined–DNFSuper-G–24Giant Slalom–DNFSlalom–28

References

External links
 Elena Prosteva at www.vancouver2010.com

1990 births
Living people
Alpine skiers at the 2010 Winter Olympics
Russian female alpine skiers
Olympic alpine skiers of Russia